Marwan Suhail Abood (born 1959) is an Iraqi wrestler. He competed in the 1984 Summer Olympics.

References

External links
 

1959 births
Living people
Wrestlers at the 1984 Summer Olympics
Iraqi male sport wrestlers
Olympic wrestlers of Iraq